The Michigan Philharmonic (or “Michigan Phil”) is a professional symphony orchestra in Southeast Michigan. The Michigan Phil has grown from a small community orchestra to an award-winning, dynamic and innovative professional regional orchestra serving several Michigan communities, including Plymouth, Canton, Birmingham-Bloomfield, Grosse Pointe, Detroit. Nan Washburn has served as Music Director and Conductor since 1999.

History
The Michigan Philharmonic was established as the Plymouth Symphony in 1945 by local residents Evelyn and Carl Groschke and Paul Wagner, director of the Plymouth High School music program, who were looking to organize a community orchestra. The orchestra began performing in the gym at Plymouth High School and then at Plymouth Colony Farms in the 1950s and before settling at the Plymouth-Salem High School Auditorium where they performed for many years.

In 1998, the orchestra began to shift from the role of a community band to a professional regional orchestra performing more progressive, innovative works with a wider geographic outreach within the Southeast Michigan area. This shift was solidified by the hiring of southern California conductor Nan Washburn after an extensive nationwide search.

Now, with 19 ASCAP awards for adventuresome programming, Nan Washburn also introduced her new and unique programming ideas as well as her dedication to music education.  The orchestra naturally began to attract new and better players, because of the opportunity to play more challenging repertoire, as well as an interest in performing contemporary classical works by living composers.  To serve the orchestra’s educational goals, a program was created in 1998 to bring classical music to 3rd and 4th graders.  Under the guidance of Nan Washburn, the program was revised and improved in 2001 and given the name CLASSical Music Outreach. in 2003 Nan Washburn founded the Michigan Philharmonic Youth Orchestra which she served as Art Director and Conductor of until 2017.

Conductors 

 Nan Washburn (1999–present)
 Russell Reed (1987–1999)
 Leon Gregorian (1986–1987)
 Charles Greenwell (1985–1986)
 Johan van der Merwe (1980–1985)
 Wayne Dunlap (1951–1979)
 Paul Wagner (1945–1950)

Awards 

 Ernst Bacon Memorial Award in the Performance of American Music, 2016 – Professional Division.
 Detroit Music Award for Outstanding Community Orchestra – 2018

External links
Michigan Philharmonic

References 

Orchestras based in Michigan
Musical groups established in 1947
1947 establishments in Michigan